Homelessness in Switzerland is a known social issue, however, there are few estimates as to the number of Swiss people affected. Homelessness is less visible in Switzerland than in many other Western countries. The majority of homeless people in Geneva are Swiss or French, with a minority from other countries.

One Swiss study found that 1.6 percent of all patients admitted to psychiatric wards were homeless. The study reported that social factors and psychopathology are independently contributing to the risk of homelessness.

In 2014, Swiss authorities reportedly began allowing homeless people to sleep in fallout shelters built during the Cold War.

There are a number of centers for providing food for the homeless, including the Suneboge community center.

References

Switzerland
Society of Switzerland